Oxycera morrisii, the white-barred soldier, is a European species of soldier fly.

Description
Body length L.4-4,5 mm. Cubital vein forked. Scutellum with only the tip yellow. Scutellum has two spines. Abdomen with five transverse whitish yellow isolated spots. A very distinct species.
Female. Black. Frons shining, orbits white interrupted on the upper part. Antennae black. One line and a white spot at the 
wing base. Scutellum white-yellow at the tip. Tarsi yellow. Halteres yellow
brown at the  base. Abdomen shining black, with five isolated whitish yellow transverse spots, last tergite yellow; 
sternites brown. - Male. Eyes bare. Sternites II-III-IV yellow medially.

Biology
The habitat is wetlands, marshes.  Adults are found in July

Distribution
Northern Europe, Central Europe

References

Stratiomyidae
Diptera of Europe
Insects described in 1833